Romario Sandu Benzar (born 26 March 1992) is a Romanian professional footballer who plays for Liga I club UTA Arad.

Club career

Viitorul Constanța 
Benzar started playing football in the Gheorghe Hagi Academy and made his debut for fellow team Viitorul Constanța in 2010. He won the Liga I in 2016–17.

FCSB
On 10 August 2017, FCSB announced the signings of Benzar and his Viitorul Constanța teammate Dragoș Nedelcu for a combined €2.7 million. Benzar penned a five-year deal with a €10 million buyout clause.

He scored his first competitive goal with a free kick in a 2–1 league victory over Juventus București.

Lecce
On 30 June 2019, it was announced that Benzar had signed with newly promoted Serie A side Lecce for a reported fee of €2,000,000.

Loan to Perugia
On 20 January 2020, he joined Serie B club Perugia on loan until the end of the 2019–20 season, with an option to purchase.

Loan to Viitorul
On 24 September 2020 he was loaned to Viitorul.

International career
Benzar made his debut for Romania U17 on 21 September 2008, in a game against Denmark.

He was part of the team which played at the 2011 UEFA European Under-19 Football Championship in Romania.

In September 2016, Benzar was selected in Romania's senior squad for the 2018 FIFA World Cup qualifier against Montenegro.

Personal life
Benzar is named after former Brazilian international Romário. His younger brother, Daniel, is also a footballer.

Career statistics

Club

International

Honours

Club
Viitorul Constanța
Liga I: 2016–17 
Supercupa României: Runner-up 2017
Liga III: 2009–10

Individual
Liga I Team of the Season: 2016–17, 2018–19

References

External links

1992 births
Living people
Sportspeople from Timișoara
Romanian footballers
Association football defenders
Liga I players
Liga II players
Liga III players
Serie A players
Serie B players
FC Viitorul Constanța players
FC Steaua București players
U.S. Lecce players
A.C. Perugia Calcio players
FCV Farul Constanța players
FC UTA Arad players
Romania youth international footballers
Romania under-21 international footballers
Romania international footballers
Romanian expatriate footballers
Romanian expatriate sportspeople in Italy